Angela Yvonne Davis (born January 26, 1944) is an American Marxist and feminist political activist, philosopher, academic, and author; she is a professor at the University of California, Santa Cruz. Davis was a longtime member of the Communist Party USA (CPUSA) and a founding member of the Committees of Correspondence for Democracy and Socialism (CCDS). She writes extensively on class, gender, race, and the U.S. prison system.

Davis was born in Birmingham, Alabama; she studied at Brandeis University and the University of Frankfurt. Studying under the philosopher Herbert Marcuse, an adherent of the Frankfurt School, Davis became increasingly engaged in far-left politics. Upon returning to the United States, she studied at the University of California, San Diego, before moving to East Germany, where she completed a doctorate at the University of Berlin. After returning to the United States, she joined the CPUSA and became involved in numerous causes, including the second-wave feminist movement and the campaign against the Vietnam War. In 1969, she was hired as an assistant professor of philosophy at the University of California, Los Angeles (UCLA). UCLA's governing Board of Regents soon fired her due to her membership in the CPUSA; after a court ruled the firing illegal, the university fired her for the use of inflammatory language.

In 1970, guns belonging to Davis were used in an armed takeover of a courtroom in Marin County, California, in which four people were killed. Prosecuted for three capital felonies—including conspiracy to murder—she was held in jail for over a year before being acquitted of all charges in 1972. During the 1980s, Davis was twice the Communist Party's candidate for vice president; at the time, she also held the position of professor of ethnic studies at San Francisco State University. In 1997, she co-founded Critical Resistance, an organization working to abolish the prison–industrial complex. In 1991, amid the dissolution of the Soviet Union, she broke away from the CPUSA to help establish the CCDS. That same year, she joined the feminist studies department at the University of California, Santa Cruz, where she became department director before retiring in 2008. Since then she has continued to write and remained active in movements such as Occupy and the Boycott, Divestment and Sanctions campaign.

Davis has received various awards, including the Soviet Union's Lenin Peace Prize and induction into the National Women's Hall of Fame. Having been accused of supporting political violence and for supporting the Soviet Union, she has been a controversial figure. In 2020, she was listed as the 1971 "Woman of the Year" in Time magazine's "100 Women of the Year" edition, which selected iconic women over the 100 years since women's suffrage in the United States of America from 1920. In 2020, she was included on Times list of the 100 most influential people in the world.

Early life
Angela Davis was born on January 26, 1944, in Birmingham, Alabama. She was christened at her father's Episcopal church. Her family lived in the "Dynamite Hill" neighborhood, which was marked in the 1950s by the bombings of houses in an attempt to intimidate and drive out middle-class black people who had moved there. Davis occasionally spent time on her uncle's farm and with friends in New York City. Her siblings include two brothers, Ben and Reginald, and a sister, Fania. Ben played defensive back for the Cleveland Browns and Detroit Lions in the late 1960s and early 1970s. 

Davis attended Carrie A. Tuggle School, a segregated black elementary school, and later, Parker Annex, a middle-school branch of Parker High School in Birmingham. During this time, Davis's mother, Sallye Bell Davis, was a national officer and leading organizer of the Southern Negro Youth Congress, an organization influenced by the Communist Party aimed at building alliances among African Americans in the South. Davis grew up surrounded by communist organizers and thinkers, who significantly influenced her intellectual development. Among them was the Southern Negro Youth Congress official Louis E. Burnham, whose daughter Margaret Burnham was Davis's friend from childhood, as well as her co-counsel during Davis's 1971 trial for murder and kidnapping.

Davis was involved in her church youth group as a child, and attended Sunday school regularly. She attributes much of her political involvement to her involvement with the Girl Scouts of the United States of America. She also participated in the Girl Scouts 1959 national roundup in Colorado. As a Girl Scout, she marched and picketed to protest racial segregation in Birmingham.

By her junior year of high school, Davis had been accepted by an American Friends Service Committee (Quaker) program that placed black students from the South in integrated schools in the North. She chose Elisabeth Irwin High School in Greenwich Village. There she was recruited by a communist youth group, Advance.

Education

Brandeis University
Davis was awarded a scholarship to Brandeis University in Waltham, Massachusetts, where she was one of three black students in her class. She encountered the Frankfurt School philosopher Herbert Marcuse at a rally during the Cuban Missile Crisis and became his student. In a 2007 television interview, Davis said, "Herbert Marcuse taught me that it was possible to be an academic, an activist, a scholar, and a revolutionary." She worked part-time to earn enough money to travel to France and Switzerland and attended the eighth World Festival of Youth and Students in Helsinki. She returned home in 1963 to a Federal Bureau of Investigation interview about her attendance at the communist-sponsored festival.

During her second year at Brandeis, Davis decided to major in French and continued her intensive study of philosopher and writer Jean-Paul Sartre. She was accepted by the Hamilton College Junior Year in France Program. Classes were initially at Biarritz and later at the Sorbonne. In Paris, she and other students lived with a French family. She was in Biarritz when she learned of the 1963 Birmingham church bombing, committed by members of the Ku Klux Klan, in which four black girls were killed. She grieved deeply as she was personally acquainted with the victims.

While completing her degree in French, Davis realized that her primary area of interest was philosophy. She was particularly interested in Marcuse's ideas. On returning to Brandeis, she sat in on his course. She wrote in her autobiography that Marcuse was approachable and helpful. She began making plans to attend the University of Frankfurt for graduate work in philosophy. In 1965, she graduated magna cum laude, a member of Phi Beta Kappa.

University of Frankfurt

In Germany, with a monthly stipend of $100, she lived first with a German family and later with a group of students in a loft in an old factory. After visiting East Berlin during the annual May Day celebration, she felt that the East German government was dealing better with the residual effects of fascism than were the West Germans. Many of her roommates were active in the radical Socialist German Student Union (SDS), and Davis participated in some SDS actions. Events in the United States, including the formation of the Black Panther Party and the transformation of Student Nonviolent Coordinating Committee (SNCC) to an all-black organization, drew her interest upon her return.

Postgraduate work
Marcuse had moved to a position at the University of California, San Diego, and Davis followed him there after her two years in Frankfurt. Davis traveled to London to attend a conference on "The Dialectics of Liberation". The black contingent at the conference included the Trinidadian-American Stokely Carmichael and the British Michael X. Although moved by Carmichael's rhetoric, Davis was reportedly disappointed by her colleagues' black nationalist sentiments and their rejection of communism as a "white man's thing".

She joined the Che-Lumumba Club, an all-black branch of the Communist Party USA named for revolutionaries Che Guevara and Patrice Lumumba, of Cuba and Congo, respectively.

Davis earned a master's degree from the University of California, San Diego, in 1968. She earned a doctorate in philosophy at the Humboldt University in East Berlin.

Professor at University of California, Los Angeles, 1969–70

Beginning in 1969, Davis was an acting assistant professor in the philosophy department at the University of California, Los Angeles (UCLA). Although both Princeton and Swarthmore had tried to recruit her, she opted for UCLA because of its urban location. At that time she was known as a radical feminist and activist, a member of the Communist Party USA, and an affiliate of the Los Angeles chapter of the Black Panther Party.

In 1969, the University of California initiated a policy against hiring Communists. At their September 19, 1969, meeting, the Board of Regents fired Davis from her $10,000-a-year post because of her membership in the Communist Party, urged on by California Governor and future president Ronald Reagan. Judge Jerry Pacht ruled the Regents could not fire Davis solely because of her affiliation with the Communist Party, and she resumed her post. 

The Regents fired Davis again on June 20, 1970, for the "inflammatory language" she had used in four different speeches. The report stated, "We deem particularly offensive such utterances as her statement that the regents 'killed, brutalized (and) murdered' the People's Park demonstrators, and her repeated characterizations of the police as 'pigs. The American Association of University Professors censured the board for this action.

Arrest and trial

Davis was a supporter of the Soledad Brothers, three inmates who were accused and charged with the killing of a prison guard at Soledad Prison.

On August 7, 1970, heavily armed 17-year-old African-American high-school student Jonathan Jackson, whose brother was George Jackson, one of the three Soledad Brothers, gained control of a courtroom in Marin County, California. He armed the black defendants and took Judge Harold Haley, the prosecutor, and three female jurors as hostages. As Jackson transported the hostages and two black defendants away from the courtroom, one of the defendants, James McClain, shot at the police. The police returned fire.

The judge and the three black men were killed in the melee. One of the jurors and the prosecutor were injured. Although the judge was shot in the head with a blast from a shotgun, he also suffered a chest wound from a bullet that may have been fired from outside the van. Evidence during the trial showed that either could have been fatal. Davis had purchased several of the firearms Jackson used in the attack, including the shotgun used to shoot Haley, which she bought at a San Francisco pawn shop two days before the incident. She was also found to have been corresponding with one of the inmates involved.

As California considers "all persons concerned in the commission of a crime, ... whether they directly commit the act constituting the offense, or aid and abet in its commission, ... are principals in any crime so committed", Davis was charged with "aggravated kidnapping and first degree murder in the death of Judge Harold Haley", and Marin County Superior Court Judge Peter Allen Smith issued a warrant for her arrest. Hours after the judge issued the warrant on August 14, 1970, a massive attempt to find and arrest Davis began. On August 18, four days after the warrant was issued, the FBI director J. Edgar Hoover listed Davis on the FBI's Ten Most Wanted Fugitive List; she was the third woman and the 309th person to be listed.

Soon after, Davis became a fugitive and fled California. According to her autobiography, during this time she hid in friends' homes and moved at night. On October 13, 1970, FBI agents found her at a Howard Johnson Motor Lodge in New York City. President Richard M. Nixon congratulated the FBI on its "capture of the dangerous terrorist Angela Davis."

On January 5, 1971, Davis appeared at Marin County Superior Court and declared her innocence before the court and nation: "I now declare publicly before the court, before the people of this country that I am innocent of all charges which have been leveled against me by the state of California." John Abt, general counsel of the Communist Party USA, was one of the first attorneys to represent Davis for her alleged involvement in the shootings.

While being held in the Women's Detention Center, Davis was initially segregated from other prisoners, in solitary confinement. With the help of her legal team, she obtained a federal court order to get out of the segregated area.

Across the nation, thousands of people began organizing a movement to gain her release. In New York City, black writers formed a committee called the Black People in Defense of Angela Davis. By February 1971, more than 200 local committees in the United States, and 67 in foreign countries, worked to free Davis from jail. John Lennon and Yoko Ono contributed to this campaign with the song "Angela". In 1972, after a 16-month incarceration, the state allowed her release on bail from county jail. On February 23, 1972, Rodger McAfee, a dairy farmer from Fresno, California, paid her $100,000 bail with the help of Steve Sparacino, a wealthy business owner. The United Presbyterian Church paid some of her legal defense expenses.

A defense motion for a change of venue was granted, and the trial was moved to Santa Clara County. On June 4, 1972, after 13 hours of deliberations, the all-white jury returned a verdict of not guilty. The fact that she owned the guns used in the crime was judged insufficient to establish her role in the plot. She was represented by Howard Moore Jr. and Leo Branton Jr., who hired psychologists to help the defense determine who in the jury pool might favor their arguments, a technique that has since become more common. They also hired experts to discredit the reliability of eyewitness accounts.

Other activities in the 1970s

Cuba
After her acquittal, Davis went on an international speaking tour in 1972 and the tour included Cuba, where she had previously been received by Fidel Castro in 1969 as a member of a Communist Party delegation. Robert F. Williams, Huey Newton, Stokely Carmichael had also visited Cuba, and Assata Shakur later moved there after escaping from a US prison. Her reception by Afro-Cubans at a mass rally was so enthusiastic that she was reportedly barely able to speak. Davis perceived Cuba as a racism-free country, which led her to believe that "only under socialism could the fight against racism be successfully executed." When she returned to the United States, her socialist leanings increasingly influenced her understanding of race struggles. In 1974, she attended the Second Congress of the Federation of Cuban Women.

Soviet Union

In 1971, the CIA estimated that five percent of Soviet propaganda efforts were directed towards the Angela Davis campaign. In August 1972, Davis visited the USSR at the invitation of the Central Committee, and received an honorary doctorate from Moscow State University.

On May 1, 1979, she was awarded the Lenin Peace Prize from the Soviet Union. She visited Moscow later that month to accept the prize, where she praised "the glorious name" of Lenin and the "great October Revolution".

East Germany

The East German government organized an extensive campaign on behalf of Davis. In September 1972, Davis visited East Germany, where she met the state's leader Erich Honecker, received an honorary degree from the University of Leipzig and the Star of People's Friendship from Walter Ulbricht. On September 11 in East Berlin she delivered a speech, "Not Only My Victory", praising the GDR and USSR and denouncing American racism.

She visited the Berlin Wall, where she laid flowers at the memorial for Reinhold Huhn, an East German guard who had been killed by a man who was trying to escape with his family across the border in 1962. Davis said, "We mourn the deaths of the border guards who sacrificed their lives for the protection of their socialist homeland" and "When we return to the USA, we shall undertake to tell our people the truth about the true function of this border." In 1973, she returned to East Berlin, leading the U.S. delegation to the 10th World Festival of Youth and Students.

Jonestown and Peoples Temple
In the mid-1970s, Jim Jones, who developed the cult Peoples Temple, initiated friendships with progressive leaders in the San Francisco area including Dennis Banks of the American Indian Movement and Davis. On September 10, 1977, 14 months before the Temple's mass murder-suicide, Davis spoke via amateur radio telephone "patch" to members of his Peoples Temple living in Jonestown in Guyana. In her statement during the "Six Day Siege", she expressed support for the People's Temple anti-racism efforts and told members there was a conspiracy against them. She said, "When you are attacked, it is because of your progressive stand, and we feel that it is directly an attack against us as well."

Aleksandr Solzhenitsyn and political prisoners in socialist countries
In 1975, Russian dissident and Nobel laureate Aleksandr Solzhenitsyn argued in a speech before an AFL–CIO meeting in New York City that Davis was derelict in having failed to support prisoners in various socialist countries around the world, given her strong opposition to the U.S. prison system. In 1972, Jiří Pelikán had written an open letter asking her to support Czechoslovak prisoners; Davis had refused, believing that the Czechoslovak prisoners were undermining the Husák government and that Pelikán, in exile in Italy, was attacking his own country. According to Solzhenitsyn, in response to concerns about Czechoslovak prisoners being "persecuted by the state", Davis had responded: "They deserve what they get. Let them remain in prison."

Alan Dershowitz, who also asked Davis to support a number of imprisoned refuseniks in the USSR, said that she declined, saying, "They are all Zionist fascists and opponents of socialism."

Later academic career

Davis was a lecturer at the Claremont Black Studies Center at the Claremont Colleges in 1975. Attendance at the course she taught was limited to 26 students out of the more than 5,000 on campus, and she was forced to teach in secret because alumni benefactors didn't want her to indoctrinate the general student population with Communist thought. College trustees made arrangements to minimize her appearance on campus, limiting her seminars to Friday evenings and Saturdays, "when campus activity is low". 

Her classes moved from one classroom to another and the students were sworn to secrecy. Much of this secrecy continued throughout Davis's brief time teaching at the colleges. In 2020 it was announced that Davis would be the Ena H. Thompson Distinguished Lecturer in Pomona College's history department, welcoming her back after 45 years.

Davis taught a women's studies course at the San Francisco Art Institute in 1978, and was a professor of ethnic studies at the San Francisco State University from at least 1980 to 1984. She was a professor in the History of Consciousness and the Feminist Studies departments at the University of California, Santa Cruz and Rutgers University from 1991 to 2008. Since then, she has been a distinguished professor emerita.

Davis was a distinguished visiting professor at Syracuse University in spring 1992 and October 2010, and was the Randolph Visiting Distinguished Professor of philosophy at Vassar College in 1995.

In 2014, Davis returned to UCLA as a regents' lecturer. She delivered a public lecture on May 8 in Royce Hall, where she had given her first lecture 45 years earlier.

In 2016, Davis was awarded an honorary Doctor of Humane Letters in Healing and Social Justice from the California Institute of Integral Studies in San Francisco during its 48th annual commencement ceremony.

Political activism and speeches
Davis accepted the Communist Party USA's nomination for vice president, as Gus Hall's running mate, in 1980 and in 1984. They received less than 0.02% of the vote in 1980. She left the party in 1991, founding the Committees of Correspondence for Democracy and Socialism. Her group broke from the Communist Party USA because of the latter's support of the 1991 Soviet coup d'état attempt after the fall of the Soviet Union and tearing down of the Berlin Wall. Davis said that she and others who had "circulated a petition about the need for democratization of the structures of governance of the party" were not allowed to run for national office and thus "in a sense ... invited to leave". In 2014, she said she continues to have a relationship with the CPUSA but has not rejoined. In the 2020 presidential election, Davis supported the Democratic nominee, Joe Biden.

Davis is a major figure in the prison abolition movement. She has called the United States prison system the "prison–industrial complex" and was one of the founders of Critical Resistance, a national grassroots organization dedicated to building a movement to abolish the prison system. In recent works, she has argued that the US prison system resembles a new form of slavery, pointing to the disproportionate share of the African-American population who were incarcerated. Davis advocates focusing social efforts on education and building "engaged communities" to solve various social problems now handled through state punishment.

As early as 1969, Davis began public speaking engagements. She expressed her opposition to the Vietnam War, racism, sexism, and the prison–industrial complex, and her support of gay rights and other social justice movements. In 1969, she blamed imperialism for the troubles oppressed populations suffer: 
We are facing a common enemy and that enemy is Yankee Imperialism, which is killing us both here and abroad. Now I think anyone who would try to separate those struggles, anyone who would say that in order to consolidate an anti-war movement, we have to leave all of these other outlying issues out of the picture, is playing right into the hands of the enemy.
She has continued lecturing throughout her career, including at numerous universities.

In 2001, she publicly spoke against the war on terror following the 9/11 attacks, continued to criticize the prison–industrial complex, and discussed the broken immigration system. She said that to solve social justice issues, people must "hone their critical skills, develop them and implement them." Later, in the aftermath of Hurricane Katrina in 2005, she declared that the "horrendous situation in New Orleans" was due to the country's structural racism, capitalism, and imperialism.

Davis opposed the 1995 Million Man March, arguing that the exclusion of women from this event promoted male chauvinism. She said that Louis Farrakhan and other organizers appeared to prefer that women take subordinate roles in society. Together with Kimberlé Crenshaw and others, she formed the African American Agenda 2000, an alliance of black feminists.

Davis has continued to oppose the death penalty. In 2003, she lectured at Agnes Scott College, a liberal arts women's college in Decatur, Georgia, on prison reform, minority issues, and the ills of the criminal justice system.

On October 31, 2011, Davis spoke at the Philadelphia and Washington Square Occupy Wall Street assemblies. Due to restrictions on electronic amplification, her words were human microphoned. In 2012, Davis was awarded the 2011 Blue Planet Award, an award given for contributions to humanity and the planet.

At the 27th Empowering Women of Color Conference in 2012, Davis said she was a vegan. She has called for the release of Rasmea Odeh, associate director at the Arab American Action Network, who was convicted of immigration fraud in relation to her hiding of a previous murder conviction.

Davis supports the Boycott, Divestment and Sanctions campaign against Israel.

Davis was an honorary co-chair of the January 21, 2017, Women's March on Washington, which occurred the day after President Donald Trump's inauguration. The organizers' decision to make her a featured speaker was criticized from the right by Humberto Fontova and the National Review. Libertarian journalist Cathy Young wrote that Davis's "long record of support for political violence in the United States and the worst of human rights abusers abroad" undermined the march.

On October 16, 2018, Dalhousie University in Halifax, Nova Scotia, presented Davis with an honorary degree during the inaugural Viola Desmond Legacy Lecture, as part of the institution's bicentennial celebration year.

On January 7, 2019, the Birmingham Civil Rights Institute (BCRI) rescinded Davis's Fred Shuttlesworth Human Rights Award, saying she "does not meet all of the criteria". Birmingham Mayor Randall Woodfin and others cited criticism of Davis's vocal support for Palestinian rights and the movement to boycott Israel. Davis said her loss of the award was "not primarily an attack against me but rather against the very spirit of the indivisibility of justice." On January 25, the BCRI reversed its decision and issued a public apology, stating that there should have been more public consultation.

In November 2019, along with other public figures, Davis signed a letter supporting Labour Party leader Jeremy Corbyn describing him as "a beacon of hope in the struggle against emergent far-right nationalism, xenophobia and racism in much of the democratic world", and endorsed him in the 2019 UK general election.

On January 20, 2020, Davis gave the Memorial Keynote Address at the University of Michigan's MLK Symposium.

Davis was elected as a member of the American Academy of Arts and Sciences in 2021.

Personal life
From 1980 to 1983, Davis was married to Hilton Braithwaite. In 1997, she came out as a lesbian in an interview with Out magazine. By 2020, Davis was living openly with her partner, the academic Gina Dent, a fellow humanities scholar and intersectional feminist researcher at UC Santa Cruz. Together, they have advocated for the abolition of police and prisons, and for black liberation and Palestinian solidarity.

Representation in other media
The first song released in support of Davis was "Angela" (1971), by Italian singer-songwriter and musician Virgilio Savona with his group Quartetto Cetra. He received some anonymous threats.
In 1972, German singer-songwriter and political activist Franz Josef Degenhardt published the song "Angela Davis", opener to his 6th studio album Mutter Mathilde.
The Rolling Stones song "Sweet Black Angel", recorded in 1970 and released on their album Exile on Main Street (1972), is dedicated to Davis. It is one of the band's few overtly political releases. Its lines include: "She's a sweet black angel, not a gun-toting teacher, not a Red-lovin' schoolmarm / Ain't someone gonna free her, free de sweet black slave, free de sweet black slave".
John Lennon and Yoko Ono released their song "Angela" on the album Some Time in New York City (1972) in support of Davis, and a small photo of her appears on the album's cover at the bottom left.
The jazz musician Todd Cochran, also known as Bayete, recorded his song "Free Angela (Thoughts...and all I've got to say)" in 1972.
Tribe Records co-founder Phil Ranelin released a song dedicated to Davis, "Angela's Dilemma", on Message From the Tribe (1972), a spiritual jazz collectible.

References in other venues
On January 28, 1972, Garrett Brock Trapnell hijacked TWA Flight 2. One of his demands was Davis's release.

In Renato Guttuso's painting The Funerals of Togliatti (1972), Davis is depicted, among other figures of communism, in the left framework, near the author's self-portrait, Elio Vittorini, and Jean-Paul Sartre.

In 1971, black playwright Elvie Moore wrote the play Angela is Happening, depicting Davis on trial with figures such as Frederick Douglass, Malcolm X, and H. Rap Brown as eyewitnesses proclaiming her innocence. The play was performed at the Inner City Cultural Center and at UCLA, with Pat Ballard as Davis.

The documentary Angela Davis: Portrait of a Revolutionary (1972) was directed by UCLA Film School student Yolande du Luart. It follows Davis from 1969 to 1970, documenting her dismissal from UCLA. The film wrapped shooting before the Marin County incident.

In the movie Network (1976), Marlene Warfield's character Laureen Hobbs appears to be modeled on Davis.

Also in 2018, a cotton T-shirt with Davis's face on it was featured in Prada's 2018 collection.

A mural featuring Davis was painted by Italian street artist Jorit Agoch in the Scampia neighborhood of Naples in 2019.

Biopic
In 2019, Julie Dash, who is credited as the first black female director to have a theatrical release of a film (Daughters of the Dust) in the US, announced that she would be directing a film based on Davis's life.

Bibliography

Books

 If They Come in the Morning: Voices of Resistance (New York: Third Press, 1971), .
 Angela Davis: An Autobiography, Random House (1974), .
Joan Little: The Dialectics of Rape (New York: Lang Communications, 1975)
Women, Race and Class, Random House (1981), .
Women, Culture & Politics, Vintage (1990), .
The Angela Y. Davis Reader (ed. Joy James), Wiley-Blackwell (1998), .
Blues Legacies and Black Feminism: Gertrude "Ma" Rainey, Bessie Smith, and Billie Holiday, Vintage Books (1999), .
Are Prisons Obsolete?, Seven Stories Press (2003), .
Abolition Democracy: Beyond Prisons, Torture, and Empire, Seven Stories Press (2005), .
The Meaning of Freedom: And Other Difficult Dialogues (City Lights, 2012), .
Freedom Is a Constant Struggle: Ferguson, Palestine, and the Foundations of a Movement, Haymarket Books (2015), .
Herbert Marcuse, Philosopher of Utopia: A Graphic Biography (foreword, City Lights, 2019), .

Interviews and appearances
 1971
 An Interview with Angela Davis. Cassette. Radio Free People, New York, 1971.
 Myerson, M. "Angela Davis in Prison". Ramparts, March 1971: 20–21.
 Seigner, Art. Angela Davis: Soul and Soledad. Phonodisc. Flying Dutchman, New York, 1971.
 Walker, Joe. Angela Davis Speaks. Phonodisc. Folkways Records, New York, 1971.
 1972–1985
 Black Journal; 67; "Interview with Angela Davis", 1972-06-20, WNET. Angela Davis makes her first national television appearance in an exclusive interview with host Tony Brown, following her recent acquittal of charges related to the San Rafael courtroom shootout.
 Jet, "Angela Davis Talks about her Future and her Freedom", July 27, 1972: 54–57.
 Davis, Angela Y. I Am a Black Revolutionary Woman (1971). Phonodisc. Folkways, New York, 1977.
 Phillips, Esther. Angela Davis Interviews Esther Phillips. Cassette. Pacifica Tape Library, Los Angeles, 1977.
Cudjoe, Selwyn. In Conversation with Angela Davis. Videocassette. ETV Center, Cornell University, Ithaca, 1985. 21-minute interview.
 1991–1997
A Place of Rage Online. Directed by Pratibha Parmar, Kali Films, season-01 1991, vimeo.com/ondemand/aplaceofrage.
 Davis, Angela Y. "Women on the Move: Travel Themes in Ma Rainey's Blues" in Borders/diasporas. Sound Recording. University of California, Santa Cruz: Center for Cultural Studies, Santa Cruz, 1992.
 Davis, Angela Y. Black Is... Black Ain't. Documentary film. Independent Television Service (ITVS), 1994.
 Interview Angela Davis (Public Broadcasting Service, Spring 1997)
 2000–2002
 Davis, Angela Y. The Prison Industrial Complex and its Impact on Communities of Color. Videocassette. University of Wisconsin – Madison, Madison, WI, 2000.
 Barsamian, D. "Angela Davis: African American Activist on Prison-Industrial Complex". Progressive 65.2 (2001): 33–38.
 "September 11 America: an Interview with Angela Davis". Policing the National Body: Sex, Race, and Criminalization. Cambridge, Ma.: South End Press, 2002.
 2010–2016
 Mountains That Take Wing: Angela Davis & Yuri Kochiyama – A Conversation on Life, Struggles & Liberation, documentary film released 2010.
 The Black Power Mixtape 1967–1975, documentary film prominently featuring Davis in a number of rarely seen Swedish interviews, released 2011.
 "Feminism and Abolition: Theories and Practices for the 21st Century" University of Chicago, 2013
 "Activist Professor Angela Davis" episode of Woman's Hour, BBC Radio 4, December 3, 2014.
Criminal Queers, a fictional DIY film examining the relationship between the LGBT community and the criminal justice system, released 2015.
 13th, documentary file about the 13th Amendment and history of the civil rights movement, released 2016.

Archives
The National United Committee to Free Angela Davis collection is at the Main Library at Stanford University, Palo Alto, California (A collection of thousands of letters received by the committee and Davis from people in the US and other countries.) 
The complete transcript of her trial, including all appeals and legal memoranda, has been preserved in the Meiklejohn Civil Liberties Library in Berkeley, California.
Davis's papers are archived at the Schlesinger Library at the Radcliffe Institute for Advanced Study in Cambridge, Massachusetts.
Records including correspondence, statements, clippings and other documents about Davis's dismissal from the University of California, Los Angeles due to her political affiliation with the Communist Party are archived at UCLA.

See also
Africana philosophy

References

Further reading
Popular media

 Round table discussion.
 Chat-room users' interview with Davis.

. Audio recording of Davis.
 Interview.
 Video interview.

Roberts, Steven V., "Angela Davis: The Making Of a Radical", New York Times, August 23, 1970.
Taylor, Keeanga-Yamahtta, "'Hell, Yes, We Are Subversive'" (review of Angela Y. Davis, Angela Davis: An Autobiography, Haymarket, 2022, 358 pp.; and Charisse Burden-Stelly and Jodi Dean, eds., Organize, Fight, Win: Black Communist Women's Political Writing, Verso, 2022, 323 pp.), The New York Review of Books, vol. LXIX, no. 14 (September 22, 2022), pp. 58, 60–62.

Books
 

Primary sources
Donald Kalish papers, Box 4 and Box 7. UCLA Library Special Collections.

External links

 
 

 

The New York Times archive of Davis-related articles, nytimes.com;
Angela Y. Davis Papers, 1937–2017 MC 940. Schlesinger Library, Radcliffe Institute, Harvard University, Cambridge, Mass.
Angela Y. Davis Collection of the Schlesinger Library A/D260. Schlesinger Library, Radcliffe Institute, Harvard University, Cambridge, Mass.
"Coalition Building Among People of Color" A discussion with Angela Y. Davis and Elizabeth Martínez (1993)

 
 

 
1944 births
Living people
Black studies scholars
Critical theorists
Lesbian academics
Activists for African-American civil rights
American anti–death penalty activists
American anti-poverty advocates
American anti-racism activists
African-American women in politics
African-American women writers
Prison abolitionists
African-American feminists
LGBT African Americans
Postmodern feminists
Radical feminists
African-American philosophers
American women philosophers
Feminist philosophers
African-American writers
American autobiographers
American feminist writers
American political writers
American women essayists
Communist women writers
American lesbian writers
Women autobiographers
Alabama socialists
American anti-capitalists
American communists
California socialists
Lesbian politicians
American LGBT politicians
African-American candidates for Vice President of the United States
Communist Party USA politicians
Female candidates for Vice President of the United States
1980 United States vice-presidential candidates
1984 United States vice-presidential candidates
Alternative Tentacles artists
American anti–Vietnam War activists
COINTELPRO targets
FBI Ten Most Wanted Fugitives
Lenin Peace Prize recipients
People acquitted of kidnapping
People acquitted of murder
Brandeis University alumni
San Francisco Art Institute faculty
University of California, San Diego alumni
University of California, Santa Cruz faculty
Activists from the San Francisco Bay Area
LGBT people from the San Francisco Bay Area
American expatriates in France
Philosophers from Alabama
Philosophers from California
Writers from Birmingham, Alabama
Writers from Oakland, California
American Book Award winners
African-American communists
Little Red School House alumni
American democratic socialists
Lesbian memoirists
African-American women academics
American women academics
African-American academics
Claremont Colleges people
20th-century African-American women
21st-century African-American women
20th-century American politicians
20th-century American essayists
21st-century American essayists
20th-century American philosophers
21st-century American philosophers
20th-century American women writers
21st-century American women writers